The Cachar bulbul (Iole cacharensis) is a species of songbird in the bulbul family, Pycnonotidae.
It is found in north-eastern India and south-eastern Bangladesh. The Cachar bulbul was considered as a subspecies of the olive bulbul until it was split off and re-classified as a separate species by the IOC in 2017.

References

Cachar bulbul
Birds of Bangladesh
Birds of Northeast India
Cachar bulbul
Cachar bulbul